The Gayoe, also known as the kuda-Gayo, is a pony from the island of Sumatra, found near Aceh. The name is derived from the Gayoe hills in the north of the island.

The Gayoe is one of eight breeds native to Indonesia; the others are the Batak Pony, Deli pony, Bali Pony, Java Pony, Sumba and Sumbawa Pony (and closely related Sandalwood Pony) and Timor Pony.

Characteristics and uses
Gayoe ponies are generally solid-colored, usually a dark bay shade commonly called "brown". Adults are approximately 12.2 hands (114 cm) tall at the withers, and small-bodied.

They are primarily used for transportation on Sumatra, and the 1997 FAO Breed Survey indicated that the breed has a stable population of about 7500 animals, thus it is not endangered.

Origin 
Horses were introduced to Nusantara archipelago in unknown date, they are descended from Tibetan or Mongol-type horses. It is possible that ancient stocks were brought to Indonesia by the Chinese Tang dynasty in the 7th century, recorded as being given to Dja-va (Kalingga kingdom), Dva-ha-la, and Dva-pa-tan (Bali). Mongolian horses are probably captured during the Mongol invasion of Java (1293). If this true, the Nusantaran ponies would owe much of its roots to the Mongolian horse as well as horses obtained from other areas of western Asia like India and Turkmenistan.

See also
List of horse breeds
Timor Pony
Batak pony

References

Horse breeds
Horse breeds originating in Indonesia